The Pentax FluCard, officially Pentax FluCard O-FC1, is a wireless accessory and memory card standard for Pentax cameras. As a memory card, it provides 16 GB of space and is specified as SDHC Class 10. As a wireless accessory, it allows remote preview and capture (also known as tethering) as well as wireless download of any images stored on the card.

Wireless communication
The FluCard sets up a wireless network. On a device connected to this network, the Chrome or Safari web browsers can be used to connect to the host "pentax". Users have additionally reported Firefox and Opera as working. Once connected, all further interaction works entirely via the browser.

Command set
The card is based on the Flucard by Trek 2000 International. A set of commands for their http-based API used to be listed on their website, but most of the content has disappeared as of May 2015. The data can still be found at the Wayback Machine, though.

A more up-to-date list of available http commands is listed on this independent developer website.

Supporting cameras
Pentax K-3
Pentax K-S1
Pentax 645Z

Weblinks
FLUCARD FOR PENTAX O-FC1, product page at RICOH IMAGING

References

Solid-state computer storage media
Pentax